The following is a list of Toll Roads in the Republic of Ireland.  Ireland has  of toll roads, bridges and tunnels.

Toll roads

Toll bridges

Tunnels

See also
 Roads in Ireland
 Motorways in the Republic of Ireland
 National primary road
 National secondary road
 Trunk Roads in Ireland
 History of roads in Ireland
 National Development Plan
 Transport 21

References

External links
 Transport Infrastructure Ireland

 
Road transport in Ireland